White Oaks Mall is a shopping centre in London, Ontario, Canada. It is located at the southwest corner of Wellington Road and Bradley Avenue, just north of Highway 401.

Location
White Oaks is located in South London, adjacent to the arterial street Wellington Road. It is serviced by the following bus routes operated by the London Transit Commission, two terminals at Jalna Boulevard, which provide bus routes 4A, 4B and 93 and 4 terminals at the Wellington Road entrance, which give bus routes 10, 13, 13A, 28, 30, 90 and 95. The mall is expected to be the southern terminus of one way on the planned London Rapid Transit system.

History

Beginnings
The mall's property was originally occupied by a small outdoor plaza, built in 1962 before major development began in the surrounding neighbourhoods. In 1972, the plaza was completely rebuilt to make way for expansion. It became a fully enclosed shopping center in 1973, anchored by Woolco in addition to 150+ stores.

Expansions
The mall's first major expansion in 1976 brought in a Simpson's department store after a major renovation to the old Sayvette. A long hall of stores that deviated west from the original race-track layout was also added. The mall saw rapid growth in the 1980s as it competed with other shopping centers in London. Over half a decade, the mall saw fewer than three major expansions. The first occurred in 1983 with Mark's and Spencer's, a food court which replaced the Loblaw's grocery store and several other new stores. A brand new wing began construction almost immediately after and opened in 1986. Over 50 more stores were added in 1988, with the most recent major expansion.

Today
White Oaks saw a slight expansion in 2006, which brought in Swedish retailer H&M along with an Applebee's Neighborhood Grill and Bar. In 2010 CPP Investment Board became the sole owner of the mall, until the property, along with two other regional malls, was acquired by Bentall Kennedy in 2013. Since Bentall Kennedy's ownership, the mall has seen a further renovation, including decorative pieces.

There are over 185 stores and services in the mall.

In 2022, it was announced that White Oaks Mall's concrete walls along the exterior would be torn apart and replaced with a modern look, with restaurants and patios along the new entrance. The construction will be completed in two phases, with the first phase set to be completed in spring 2023.

Criticism
In recent years, the mall has received criticism for forcing out independent stores. For example, the gift shop Durga had been a mall tenant for 26 years. Similarly, Logo Sports was also denied a lease renewal in 2014 after 25 years at the mall and was later replaced by a competing franchise.

See also
List of largest enclosed shopping malls in Canada

References

External links

 White Oaks Mall

1973 establishments in Ontario
Buildings and structures in London, Ontario
Shopping malls in Ontario
Shopping malls established in 1973
Tourist attractions in London, Ontario